Roger Federer was the defending champion, but lost in the first round to Tommy Haas.

Andy Roddick won in the final 6–3, 7–6(8–6), against Tommy Haas.

Players

Draw

Main draw

Play-offs

External links
Official AAMI Classic website
2006 AAMI Classic results

Kooyong Classic
AAMI